Bình Hòa is a ward of Thuận An town in Bình Dương Province of Southeast region of Vietnam. First Vietnam Singapore Industrial Park (VSIP) is located in Bình Đáng near An Phú ward.

Administrative divisions
Bình Hòa is divided into 8 neighborhoods:

 Bình Đức 1
 Bình Đức 2
 Bình Đức 3
 Bình Đáng
 Đồng An 1
 Đồng An 2
 Đồng An 3
 Đông Ba

References

Populated places in Bình Dương province